The 2010–11 season, Persela will compete in the Indonesian Super League and the Piala Indonesia.

Review and events

PS Lamongan recorded a surprise 8-0 win over PS Petrogres in a friendly at the Surajaya Stadium on August 18, 2010 in Lamongan, East Java.

Pre-season

Match results

Legend

Indonesia Super League

Last updated: 17 April 2011Source: Persatuan Sepakbola Lamongan

See also

 2010–11 Indonesian Super League

References

Persela Lamongan